Abul Fazal Ziaur Rahman was a physician and army officer who was killed in the Bangladesh Liberation war. He is considered a martyr in Bangladesh.

Early life
Rahman was born in Noagon, Araihazar, Narayanganj on February 2, 1926. He graduated from Kathghar High School in Sandwip in 1944 and from Chittagong College in 1946. He Graduated from Dhaka Medical College after completing his MBBS degree.

Career
Rahman joined the Pakistan Army Medical Corps in 1949. He served at the Combined Military Hospitals in Rangpur and Dhaka. In 1963, he was promoted to lieutenant colonel. In 1968, he was made the superintendent and principal of Sylhet Medical College, and also served as the dean of the Faculty of Medicine from 1969 to 1970. During his tenure, Rahman worked to expand the residential quarters and hostels of the medical school.

Death
In 1971, Rahman was transferred to Islamabad, West Pakistan, but he refused the transfer. The Pakistan Army placed him under house arrest. On 14 April 1971, he was taken from his home by the Pakistan Army and was never seen again. On 14 December 1995, Bangladesh Post Office issued commemorative stamps in his name on the occasion of Martyred Intellectuals Day.

References

1926 births
Missing person cases in Bangladesh
People killed in the Bangladesh Liberation War
People from Narayanganj District
People from Sandwip Upazila
Bangladeshi military doctors
Dhaka Medical College alumni
Chittagong College alumni
Year of death unknown